Ham Mocking Noah is an early 16th century (1510-1515) painting by Bernardino Luini currently in the Brera Gallery in Milan, Italy.

Subject
The subject is the Old Testament story of Noah when drunk.  Shem and Japheth averted their eyes from their father's nudity, and covered him, but Ham mocked his father.  The story is found in Genesis 9.

The story is illustrated in many Biblia Pauperum and the  Speculum Humanae Salviationis.

It is also illustrated in the Great East Window of York Minster, and the Tudor stained glass of Kings College Chapel - of a very similar date to the painting (tenth window, upper right).

By the medieval period much thought had been given to the story and the Egerton Genesis includes expository material, some of it dating back to Origen.  In 1519 both of Martin Luther's sermons dealt with the analogy between Ham mocking Noah and the Jews mocking Christ.

Artist
Bernardino Luini (c. 1480/82 – June 1532) was a North Italian painter from Leonardo's circle. Both Luini and Giovanni Antonio Boltraffio were said to have worked with Leonardo directly; he was described to have taken "as much from Leonardo as his native roots enabled him to comprehend". Consequently, many of his works were attributed to Leonardo.

See also
 Curse of Ham

References

Italian paintings
Paintings depicting Noah
Paintings in the collection of the Pinacoteca di Brera